This list of snakes of Florida includes all snakes in the U.S. state of Florida.

Non-venomous

Black Racers (Coluber) 

 Southern Black Racer

Coachwhips (Masticophis) 

 Eastern Coachwhip

Red Belly Snakes (Storeria) 

 Florida Brown Snake
 Florida redbelly snake

Crayfish Snakes (Liodytes) 

 Glossy Crayfish Snake
 Striped Crayfish Snake

Crowned Snakes (Tantilla) 

 Southeastern Crown Snake

Garter Snakes (Thamnophis) 

 Eastern Garter Snake
 Southern Ribbon Snake
 Bluestripe Garter Snake

Green Snakes (Opheodrys) 

 Rough Green Snake

Hognose Snakes (Heterodon) 

 Eastern Hognose Snake
 Southern Hognose Snake

Indigo Snakes (Drymarchon) 

 Eastern Indigo Snake

Kingsnakes (Lampropeltis) 

 Florida Kingsnake
 Mole Kingsnake
 Scarlet Kingsnake
 Short-tailed Snake

Rainbow Snakes (Farancia) 

 Eastern Mud Snake 
 Rainbow Snake

Pine Snakes (Pituophis) 

Black Pine Snake
 Florida Pine Snake

Pine Woods Snake (Rhadinea) 

 Pine Woods Snake

Rat Snakes (Pantherophis) 

 Gray Rat Snake
 Red Rat Snake (Corn Snake)
 Eastern Rat Snake (Yellow Rat Snake)

Ring-necked Snakes (Diadophis) 

 Southern Ring-necked Snake

Scarlet Snakes (Cemophora) 

 Scarlet Snake

Water Snakes (Nerodia) 

 Brown Watersnake
 Florida Banded Watersnake
 Red-Bellied Watersnake

Venomous

Pit Vipers (Crotalinae) 

 Florida Cottonmouth
 Southern Copperhead
 Eastern Diamondback Rattlesnake
 Timber Rattlesnake (Canebrake Rattlesnake)
 Dusky Pygmy Rattlesnake

Elapid (Elapidae) 

 Eastern Coral Snake

References

Florida